Elections to Colchester Borough Council were held on 5 May 1984, alongside other local elections across the United Kingdom.

Summary

Ward results

Berechurch

Castle

Dedham

East Donyland

Harbour

Lexden

Marks Tey

Mile End

New Town

Prettygate

Shrub End

St. Andrews

St. Annes

St. Johns

St. Marys

Stanway

Tiptree

West Mersea

Wivenhoe

References

1984
1984 English local elections
May 1984 events in the United Kingdom
1980s in Essex